Atli Guðjón Helgason (born 7 March 1967) is an Icelandic lawyer and former footballer who played three games for the Iceland national football team. In 2001 he was sentenced to 16 years in prison for the murder of his business partner.

Football career

Club career
Atli played for 14 seasons in the Icelandic leagues. He was the captain of the Víkingur Reykjavík team that won the national championship in 1991.

National team career
He won three caps and scored one goal for the Iceland national football team between 1991 and 1992.

Murder of Einar Örn Birgisson
On November 8, 2000, 27 year old former footballer Einar Örn Birgisson went missing. Einar, the son of former basketball star Birgir Örn Birgis, was Atli's business partner and former teammate. A week later, Atli confessed to his murder, having beaten Einar four times in his head with a hammer in Öskjuhlíð in Reykjavík and hiding his body near Grindavík. On 29 May 2001 he was sentenced to 16 years in prison for the murder. He was released from prison in 2010.

References

External links

1967 births
Living people
Atli Helgason
Atli Helgason
Atli Helgason
Atli Helgason
Atli Helgason
Atli Helgason